Frank Pierrepont Graves (July 23, 1869 – September 13, 1956) was Commissioner of the New York State Education Department from 1921 to 1940. Prior to assuming the commissionership, Graves was a noted historian of education, college administrator, and author.

Early life and education

Graves was born in Brooklyn, New York on July 23, 1869. He was educated in the Brooklyn Public schools, and attended Columbia University, earning an A.B. in 1889 and a Ph.D. in Greek in 1892. He gained membership in Phi Beta Kappa, Phi Delta Kappa, and Phi Beta Phi.  In 1895, he married Helen Hope Wadsworth.

Academic career

Graves taught Greek at Columbia for two years and at Tufts College for five.  He later became president of the State University of Wyoming for two years, and president of the University of Washington for five years.  Both institutions quadrupled their enrollment during his tenure.

This experience heightened Dr. Graves' interest in the history of education; and so he returned to Columbia and earned another Doctorate, this time in Education.  Graves went on to become professor of the History of Education at the University of Missouri, Ohio State University, and the University of Pennsylvania, over a period from 1904 to 1921.  During this time he also taught at the University of Wisconsin, the University of Chicago, and at Columbia.

Commissioner in New York

Graves became Commissioner of the New York State Education Department in 1921, and held that post under six governors, for nearly two decades. Under his tenure, the state took major steps in rural school consolidation, an important, if often very controversial, endeavor.  Graves is the longest-serving commissioner in the history of the department to date.  After his retirement, he passed the bar exam in 1943.  By the end of his career, Graves held 43 academic degrees. In 1937, Graves ruled that Rose Freistater was ineligible to be issued a teaching license for being overweight.

His wife Helen died in 1943, and he remarried to Jessie Chase Malcolm.

Graves died in Albany on September 13, 1956.

Selected publications

Burial Customs of the Greeks, (Columbia University)
A History of Education Before the Middle Ages, (MacMillan)
A History of Education During the Middle Ages, (MacMillan)
A History of Education in Modern Times, (MacMillan)
Great Educators of Three Centuries, (MacMillan)
Peter Ramus and the Educational Renaissance of the Sixteenth Century, (MacMillan)
A Student's History of Education, (MacMillan)
What Did Jesus Teach?, (MacMillan)

See also
 Educational Review

References

Columbia College (New York) alumni
Tufts University faculty
University of Wyoming faculty
University of Washington faculty
University of Missouri faculty
University of Wisconsin–Madison faculty
University of Chicago faculty
Ohio University faculty
University of Pennsylvania faculty
Presidents of the University of Wyoming
Education in New York (state)
People from Brooklyn
1869 births
1956 deaths
Commissioners of Education of the State of New York